Lee Township is a township in Polk County, Iowa, United States.

Its elevation is listed as 807 feet above mean sea level.

History
Lee Township was established after 1880.

References

Townships in Polk County, Iowa
Townships in Iowa